Kathleen Denise Quinlan Abbott (born November 19, 1954) is an American film and television actress. She is best known for her Golden Globe-nominated performance in the 1977 film of the novel I Never Promised You a Rose Garden, and her Golden Globe and Academy Award-nominated role in the 1995 film Apollo 13, along with many roles in other feature films, television movies and series, in a career spanning almost five decades.

Personal life
She was born in Pasadena, California, the daughter of Josephine (née Zachry), a military supply supervisor, and Robert Quinlan, a television sports director, and raised in Mill Valley, California, where she attended Tamalpais High School, studied drama, and began her acting career.

She was married to artist Warren Long in 1987. She met actor Bruce Abbott on the TV movie Trapped (1989) and they married on April 12, 1994. They have one son, Tyler, who was born in 1990.

Career
Quinlan had an uncredited role in 1972's One Is a Lonely Number but her official credited film debut was in George Lucas's 1973 movie American Graffiti, at the age of nineteen. 

As a young actress in the 1970s, she also had guest-starring roles in many popular television series of the day, including Police Woman, Kojak, Ironside, Emergency!, and The Waltons.

Her most celebrated roles include playing Deborah, a sixteen-year-old schizophrenic, in the film version of the novel I Never Promised You a Rose Garden, for which she earned a Best Actress in a Motion Picture-Drama Golden Globe nomination, and portraying Marilyn Lovell, the wife of Tom Hanks's astronaut character Jim Lovell, in the 1995 movie Apollo 13, earning her both a Best Supporting Actress – Motion Picture Golden Globe nomination and a Best Supporting Actress Academy Award nomination.

Quinlan also appeared in feature films like Lifeguard (1976), Airport '77 (1977), The Promise (1979), The Runner Stumbles (1979),  Sunday Lovers (1980), Twilight Zone: The Movie (1983), Sunset (1988), Clara's Heart (1988), and Trial by Jury (1994). She featured in numerous TV movies as well, including Little Ladies of the Night (1977), She's in the Army Now (1981), Blackout (1985), Trapped (1989), Strays (1991), Last Light (1993), the adaptation of the novel In the Lake of the Woods (1996), Blessings (2003), and more. She played Jim Morrison's Celtic pagan consort Patricia Kennealy-Morrison in Oliver Stone's The Doors. In 1997, she appeared in Event Horizon (1997) and won a Blockbuster Entertainment Award as Favorite Supporting Actress-Suspense for Breakdown (1997), playing Kurt Russell's character's kidnapped wife.

She had a main role for three seasons on the series Family Law, along with recurring roles as the mother of the two brothers on Prison Break, and in Chicago Fire and Blue. She was in two episodes of Alfred Hitchcock Presents, plus episodes of many other shows, such as Diagnosis: Murder, Glee, and The Event. She was in the TV series House, the 2006 remake of the horror classic The Hills Have Eyes, the 2007 film Breach, Made of Honor (2008), and played a senator in "Alliances," a 2011 episode of the science-fiction series Stargate Universe.

, Quinlan's most recent work is a 2019 episode of How to Get Away with Murder, a lead role in the film Walking with Herb, filmed in 2018 and released in 2021, and a part in the horror flick The Stairs.

Filmography

Film

Television

Awards and nominations 
 Best Actress Golden Globe Nomination 1978 - I Never Promised You a Rose Garden (1977)
 Best Supporting Actress Golden Globe Nomination 1996  - Apollo 13 (1995)
 Best Supporting Actress Academy Award Nomination 1996 - Apollo 13 (1995)
 Blockbuster Entertainment Award as Favorite Supporting Actress-Suspense Winner - Breakdown (1997)
 20/20 Awards Best Supporting Actress Nomination 2016 - Apollo 13 (1995)
 Awards Circuit Community Awards (ACCA) Best Actress in a Supporting Role Nomination - Apollo 13 (1995)
Awards Circuit Community Awards (ACCA) Best Cast Ensemble - Apollo 13 (1995)
 Chicago Film Critics Association Awards (CFCA Award) Nominee for Best Supporting Actress 1996 - Apollo 13 (1995)
 Dallas-Fort Worth Film Critics Association Awards (DFWFCA Award) Nominee for Best Supporting Actress 1996 - Apollo 13 (1995)
 European Cinematography Awards (ECA) Best Actress Winner 2020 - The Stairs (2021)
 FilmQuest (FilmQuest Cthulhu) Best Supporting Actress Winner 2018 - Chimera Strain (2018)
 Mystfest Best Actress Winner 1985 - Blackout (1985)
 NOLA Horror Film Fest Best Supporting Role Winner 2018 - Chimera Strain (2018)
 Online Film & Television Association (OFTA Television Award) Best Actress in a New Drama Series Nominee 2000 - Family Law (1999)
 Screen Actors Guild Awards Outstanding Performance by a Cast Winner 1996 - Apollo 13 (1995) (shared with Kevin Bacon, Tom Hanks, Ed Harris, Bill Paxton, and Gary Sinise)

References

External links

1954 births
Living people
20th-century American actresses
21st-century American actresses
American film actresses
American television actresses
Outstanding Performance by a Cast in a Motion Picture Screen Actors Guild Award winners
Actresses from Pasadena, California
People from Mill Valley, California
Tamalpais High School alumni